Gabin is a French surname. Notable people with the surname include:

George Gabin (1931–2012), American painter and art educator
Jean Gabin (1904–1976), French actor and singer
Mata Gabin (born 1972), French actress and author

See also
Gavin

French-language surnames